Mariusz Rytkowski (born 26 July 1976) is a Polish weightlifter. He competed in the men's light heavyweight event at the 2000 Summer Olympics.

References

1976 births
Living people
Polish male weightlifters
Olympic weightlifters of Poland
Weightlifters at the 2000 Summer Olympics
People from Mińsk Mazowiecki